Sam, Samuel, Samantha or similar, surnamed Carpenter may refer to:

 Sam Carpenter (born 1987), Australian rules football player 
 Samuel Carpenter (1649–1714), First Treasurer and Deputy Governor of Pennsylvania
 Samuel Carpenter (mayor), the mayor of Lancaster, Pennsylvania, USA
 Sam Carpenter (politician) (Republican Party), author (Work the System), and businessman (CEO Centratel)
 Samantha "Sam" Carpenter, a fictional character from the 5th Scream franchise film Scream (2022 film)

See also

 
List of people with surname Carpenter
Carpenter (disambiguation)
Sam (disambiguation)